Necdet Darıcıoğlu (4 May 1926 – 14 September 2016) was a Turkish judge. He was born in Antalya. He was president of the Constitutional Court of Turkey from 2 March 1990 until 4 May 1991. He died in Ankara on 14 September 2016.

References

External links
Web-site of the Constitutional Court of Turkey  

Turkish judges
1926 births
2016 deaths
Presidents of the Constitutional Court of Turkey